Serenade or Schubert's Serenade is a 1940 French historical film directed by Jean Boyer and starring Lilian Harvey, Louis Jouvet and Bernard Lancret. It portrays a fictional romance between the Austrian composer Franz Schubert and an English dancer. The film was the first of two the Anglo-German actress Lillian Harvey made in France, after leaving Nazi Germany.

Plot summary

Cast

References

Bibliography

External links 
 
 

1940 films
French historical romance films
French black-and-white films
1940s historical romance films
1940s French-language films
Films directed by Jean Boyer
Films set in Vienna
Films set in the 19th century
Films about composers
Films about classical music and musicians
Films scored by Paul Abraham
Cultural depictions of Franz Schubert
Depictions of Ludwig van Beethoven on film
Cultural depictions of Klemens von Metternich
Films set in the Austrian Empire
1940s French films